The 1925 Estonian Football Championship was the fifth top-division football league season in Estonia, organized by the Estonian Football Association. It was played as a knock-out tournament. VS Sport Tallinn won the championship.

Play-offs
Teams are eliminated after two losses. Play-offs are played until two teams are left.

Final

Top Goalscorer 
 Aleksander Gerassimov (VS Sport Tallinn) - 4 goals

References

Estonian Football Championship
1